The Rockhouse Subdivision is a railroad line owned by CSX Transportation in the U.S. state of Kentucky. At its west end the line continues east from the EK Subdivision and at its east end the line continues east as the E&BV Subdivision

See also
 List of CSX Transportation lines

References

CSX Transportation lines
Transportation in Letcher County, Kentucky
Transportation in Perry County, Kentucky